Zeek Afridi (born Zahid Noor Afridi on 1 April 1979 in Peshawar) is a Pashtun singer from Pakistan.

Early life and career
Afridi belongs to the Afridi tribe of Tirah. He was raised and educated in Peshawar. He attended F.G. Boys Public School and Government College Peshawar. After graduating, he obtained a Master's degree from University of Peshawar. He starts singing from his college life, he often won first prize in singing competitions. After completion of his Master's degree in 2001, he released his first album "Bibisherinay" – it was a selection of folk songs in Pushto and later he released Urdu versions of the album. He has also sung an official anthem for the Peshawar Zalmi named "Zalmi Tarana" or "O Da Pekhawar Zalmi.

Awards and nominations

|-
|2017
|colspan="2"|Pride of Peshawar
|
|-
|}

References

External links
Zeek Afridi youtube channel

 Official Facebook Account 

Living people
21st-century Pakistani male singers
Pashtun people
1979 births
People from Peshawar
Musicians from Khyber Pakhtunkhwa
University of Peshawar alumni